Where We're Meant to Be is a 2016 American drama film written and directed by Michael Howard. The film travels in and out of the lives of a number of different characters as each one connects to the next during their most pivotal moments.

The film won multiple awards during its film festival run and was picked up for distribution by TurnKey Films in 2017. It was released via Flix Premiere in July 2017.

Plot 

The film consists of multiple storylines and each story has a character or incident that changes the life of another character in a variety of ways. Some interactions are very direct while others may be small, seemingly inconsequential, moments that have just as large of an impact. The film explores these moments and more as we see into various lives during certain vital moments.

The stories broadly consist of:
 A couple on a blind date.
 A sister deals with loss concerning her brother and nephew.
 An older woman dating a younger man must choose between her relationship and her children.
 An FBI surveillance team oversees an abduction and the resulting fallout.
 A teenage boy and girl attempt their first sexual experience.
 An engaged mother of two deals with an unexpected illness.
 A married couple struggle with the thought of parenting.

Primary cast 
 Blayne Weaver as Charlie
 Tate Hanyok as Anna
 Sarah Bousquet as Samantha
 Meredith Sause as Beth
 Lex Wilson as Cameron
 Harper Grimmett as Finn
 Tracey Coppedge as Carrie
 Tim Ross as Bobby
 Anna Nalepka as Wendy
 Seth Nicholas Gore as Will
 Rob Rainbolt as Peter
 Michael Howard as John
 Don Sill as Chad
 Shalita McFarland as Tisha
 Thaddaeus Edwards as Walter
 Eric Pastore as Jeff
 Stephanie Minervino as Katie
 Christopher Houldsworth as Mac
 Jack Harrison as Ferrante
 Pepi Streiff as Granny

Production 
Where We're Meant to Be was filmed on a budget of $25,000 over 23 days between May and July 2015. The film was shot on location in North Carolina with filming taking place in Raleigh, Durham, Apex, Roxboro, Cary and Fuquay-Varina.

Music 

The score was written by Steven Grove and the soundtrack consists of songs from Greg Laswell, Cary Brothers, Jack the Radio, Day at the Fair, Buddy (band), Tom Rosenthal (musician), Butterfly Boucher, and other indie artists from around the world.

Themes 

The central theme of the film is connection and how small moments that seem inconsequential can make a huge difference in a life. And since you don't know what moments can make the difference, there's no point in stressing out about it. Howard says of the theme that "one of the most important aspects is to just live your life regardless of what's happening around you. If you're worried or stressed out about something, it's not going to do any good to shut down and not keep moving on. And whether the situation turns out good or bad, there was still so much wasted time in that interim. It's not how much time you have; it's how you use that time that makes all the difference.

Reception 

The film had its world premiere on April 8, 2016 at the Vail Film Festival and continued on with a successful film festival run. It garnered more than a dozen award wins and nominations throughout the festival circuit and was picked up for distribution by TurnKey Films in 2017.

Critical reception 

Where We're Meant to Be received positive reviews from critics.

Reel Honest Reviews: "A thoughtful, beautiful film full of love and emotion. Creating such a philosophical and entertaining film on this budget should be lauded as a true accomplishment. Be sure to catch this film...it might just change how you see the world."

Indie Spotlight Network: "...bravely written script with heartfelt dialogue as well as compelling character development."

The Independent Critic: "Where We're Meant to be is an indie gem" and "emotionally honest story and performances along with an uncommon intelligence that permeates through every digital cell of the film."

Accolades

Release 
TurnKey Films released the film via Flix Premiere in the United Kingdom on 30 June 2017 and the United States on 7 July 2017.

References

External links 

 
 Official Trailer
 Teaser Trailer

2016 films
2016 drama films
2016 independent films
American independent films
Films shot in North Carolina
American drama films
2010s English-language films
2010s American films